The 2017 SAFF U-15 Women's Championship was the 1st edition of the SAFF U-15 Women's Championship, an international football competition for women's under-15 national teams organized by SAFF. The tournament was hosted by Bangladesh from 17–24 December 2017 at Bangabandhu National Stadium and BSSSM Mostofa Kamal Stadium. Four teams from the region took part.

Participating teams

Venues

Group stage
All matches were played in Dhaka, Bangladesh.
Times listed are UTC+06:00.

Final

Awards

Goalscorers
4 goals
  Naorem Priyanka Devi

3 goals
  Anuching Mogini
  Tohura Khatun
  Sunita Munda

2 goals

  Akhi Khatun
  Monika Chakma
  Shamsunnahar
  Kynda Kom Serto

1 goal

  Diki
  Sabita Rana Magar
  Sajeda Khatun
  Thounaojam Kritina Devi
  Pratiksha Lakra
  Santhiya
  Pusparani Chanu

References

2017
2017 in women's association football
2017
2017 in Bangladeshi football
2017 in Asian football
2017 in youth association football